Ray Lau Kong-wah, JP (born 22 June 1957, Hong Kong), also called Ray Lau, is a former Hong Kong Government official and former member of both the Legislative Council and the Executive Council. Until 2020, he was Secretary for Home Affairs. 

Lau was vice-chairman of the pro-Beijing Hong Kong political party, the Democratic Alliance for the Betterment and Progress of Hong Kong (DAB), after founding the similarly aligned Civil Force in 1993. Before that, he was a member of a pro-democracy party, United Democrats of Hong Kong, one of the predecessors of the Democratic Party.

Education
Lau Kong-wah received secondary education in St Paul's College, Hong Kong, an Anglican school. He graduated from the University of Exeter and the City Polytechnic of Hong Kong.

Political career 
Lau was a member of the United Democrats of Hong Kong (a predecessor of the Democratic Party). After losing in the 1991 LegCo election, running as 'Ray Lau', he left the party and founded the Civil Force. He subsequently joined the DAB in 1998.

On 14 October 2008, Chief Executive Donald Tsang appointed Lau a non-official member of the Executive Council, filling the vacancy left by the resignation of Jasper Tsang, a role he held, in parallel with his Legco seat, until June 2012.

In 2012, Lau lost his seat in the 2012 Hong Kong Legislative Council Election.

On 20 December 2012, he was appointed undersecretary for constitutional and mainland affairs by Chief Executive CY Leung, tasked with overseeing political reforms. During the 2014 Occupy movement, as one of five officials representing the government in the televised debate with student representatives, he was mocked for saying not a word, and was then widely represented as hiding inside a typical Hong Kong rubbish bin.

On 21 July 2015, Leung moved Lau to the role of Secretary for Home Affairs, a post he held through into the administration of Carrie Lam. He was removed from the post in a cabinet reshuffle on  22 April 2020.

References
 DAB website

1957 births
Living people
Alumni of St. Paul's College, Hong Kong
Alumni of the University of Exeter
Alumni of the City University of Hong Kong
Alumni of the Education University of Hong Kong
District councillors of Sha Tin District
Democratic Alliance for the Betterment and Progress of Hong Kong politicians
United Democrats of Hong Kong politicians
Civil Force politicians
Members of the Regional Council of Hong Kong
Members of the Provisional Legislative Council
HK LegCo Members 1998–2000
HK LegCo Members 2000–2004
HK LegCo Members 2004–2008
HK LegCo Members 2008–2012
Hong Kong people of Shun Tak descent
Government officials of Hong Kong
Hong Kong educators
Members of the Selection Committee of Hong Kong
Members of the Election Committee of Hong Kong, 2021–2026
Members of the 14th Chinese People's Political Consultative Conference